Jay's river snail also known as the rugose rocksnail, scientific name Lithasia jayana, is a species of small freshwater snail with a gill and an operculum, an aquatic gastropod mollusk in the family Pleuroceridae, the hornsnails. This species is endemic to the United States.

References 

Molluscs of the United States
Pleuroceridae
Gastropods described in 1841
Taxonomy articles created by Polbot